Oireachtas na Gaeilge (“The Irish (language) Gathering”) is an annual arts festival of Irish culture, which has run since the 1890s.  Inspired by the Welsh eisteddfodau, the festival has included different events connected with Irish language and culture over the years.  Today the festival organisation runs events throughout the year, but the most prominent is Oireachtas na Samhna (“the November gathering”) held on the last weekend of October or the first of November, when more than 100,000 people attend the seven-day event.

History
The first Oireachtas na Gaeilge festival was organised in 1897 by Conradh na Gaeilge (the Gaelic League), which envisaged it as part of a renaissance of traditional Irish arts and culture. in the Round Room of Dublin's Rotunda, one of the largest halls in the city at that time. It was just a half-day festival, but the attendance still exceeded a thousand people, an unexpected level of interest.

In contrast to today's festival, there was little emphasis on the performing arts. The competitions included two for poetry, five for prose essays, one for poetry compilations; a competition for unpublished songs or stories in Irish; a competition for new song compositions and a recitation competition.

While the festival management pulled off accomplishments including the staging of the first Irish-language opera, the popularity of the Oireachtas waned in the early part of the twentieth century, and the festival was cancelled for a number of years in the 1920s and 1930s. In response, the organisers, under the Directorship of Liam Ó Maolaodha attempted from the 1990s on to market the festival to younger speakers of Irish via outings, discos, and other youth-oriented events.

The festival was originally held in Dublin, but since the 1970s, it has been held in different cities and towns around Ireland. The festival culminates in four major competitions over the weekend:

 Corn Uí Riada, a sean-nós singing competition for all age and gender categories,
 Comórtas na mBan, a sean-nós singing competition for women
 Comórtas na bhFear, a sean-nós singing competition for men,
 Comórtas Damhsa ar an Sean Nós ("Steip"), a free-style dancing competition

Although the majority of participants in Comórtas Damhsa ar an Sean Nós practice Conamara individual step style now popular around the country, the competition also includes dancing in other regional styles.

Past winners of Corn Uí Riada include Áine Uí Cheallaigh, Lillis Ó Laoire, Máirtín Tom Sheánín Mac Donnchadha, Mícheál Ó Confhaola and 2008 winner Ciarán Ó Con Cheanainn from Spiddal, County Galway.

Venue

Media coverage
RTÉ Raidió na Gaeltachta has been covering the bigger Oireachtas events live since 1973 and these broadcasts are in considerable demand from internet audiences around the globe, particularly Corn Uí Riada and the sean-nós stage competitions. Steip, the Sean nós dancing competition, on TG4 has consistently attracted the station's highest annual audience figures. Its success is due to the hard work of Festival administrator Máirín Nic Dhonnchadha who effectively revived the competition from 2000 onwards. In 2008, for the first time, the station broadcast live segments of the Corn Uí Riada competition.

References

External links
Festival website
An Irishwoman's Diary Preview in Irish Times 2008 by Catherine Foley

Irish language
Cultural festivals in Ireland
Celtic music festivals
Festivals established in 1897